Mads Eriksen Bølle (died 1539) was a Danish  privy councillor, landowner and fiefholder. He was during the Count's Feud in opposition to Christian III and the introduction of Protestantism but was after the Reformation  nonetheless allowed to keep his fiefs.

Early life

Bølle was the son of Erik Madsen Bølle (died  1492 or later) and Anne Sivertsdatter Blaa. He was the brother of Ejler Eriksen Bølle.

Holdings
He inherited Orebygaard on Lolland and Fuglsang Manor after his mother's death. Prio to her death in 1495, he was queen Dorothea's lensmand (høvedsmand) at Haraldsborg. In 1500, he was by the Bishopric of Roskilde granted Hjortholm in North Zealand as a fief. In 1505, Bishop Johan Jepsen Ravensberg, a relative, granted him Tureby, Spanager and Egby for life for himself, his wife and his son Erik. In  1507. he was also granted St. Agnetes' Priory in Roskilde.

Career
Bølle was from at least 1512 a member of the Privy Council and was knighted by Christian II. In 1523, he participated in Frederick I's siege of Copenhagen. When Christian II  attempted to reclaim the thrones in 1531, he was involved in his arrest in Copenhagen as well as the return of the Church of Our Lady to the Catholic church.

During the Count's Feud, he sided Count Christoffer, but was nonetheless, together with his son, Erik, from January 1535 held in captivity in Copenhagen. In early 1536, they were sent to Mecklenburg. after Copenhagen's surrender, he was handed over to Christian II. He was pardoned by a revers of 27 October the same year. He was allowed to keep his fiefs but lost his seat in the Priby Council. In 1536, Christian III granted him Tersløsegaard-

Personal life
Bølle married Birgitte Clausdatter Daa of Ravnstrup. They had two children, Erik Madsen Bølle, himself a member of the Pricy Council, and a fiefholder, and a daughter, Dorthe, who married Knud Rud of Vedbygård.

Bølle died before 14 November  1539 and is buried in Tureby Church.

References

16th-century Danish nobility
16th-century Danish landowners
Knights of the Order of the Dannebrog
Bølle family